Andy Macdonald is a former Scotland international rugby union player.

Rugby Union career

Amateur career

MacDonald played for Loughborough Students before moving on to play for Cambridge University.

He later played for Heriot's.

Provincial career

He played for Southland, a province in New Zealand.

He played for the Scottish Exiles in the Scottish Inter-District Championship.

When he moved to play for Heriots, he then turned out for Edinburgh District.

International career

He was capped by Scotland 'B' to play against France 'B' in 1990. He earned 3 'B' caps in total.

He was capped by Scotland 'A' to play against Spain in 1991. He earned 6 'A' caps in total.

Macdonald made his international debut on 20 November 1993 at Murrayfield in the Scotland vs New Zealand match.
He was on the losing side in his only test match.

He also represented the Barbarians 8 times including a drawn test match against Scotland in 1991.

References

1966 births
Living people
Alumni of Loughborough University
Loughborough Students RUFC players
Rugby union locks
Rugby union players from Nairn
Scotland 'A' international rugby union players
Scotland 'B' international rugby union players
Scotland international rugby union players
Scottish rugby union players